The 2004–05 Football League Cup (known as the Carling Cup for sponsorship reasons) was the 45th staging of the Football League Cup, a knockout competition for England's top 92 football clubs.  The competition name reflects a sponsorship deal with lager brand Carling.

The competition began in August 2004 and ended with the final on 25 February 2005. The Millennium Stadium in Cardiff hosted the final match, as it had done since 2001, with the new Wembley Stadium still not complete.

The winners were Chelsea, beating Liverpool in the final 3–2 thanks to an own goal from Steven Gerrard, and goals in extra-time from Didier Drogba and Mateja Kežman in extra-time after the match finished 1–1.

First round

Second round

Third round

Fourth round

Quarter-finals

Semi-finals

First leg

Second leg

Chelsea win 2–1 on aggregate.

Liverpool win 2–0 on aggregate

Final

See also
 Football League Cup

External links
 Official Carling Cup website
 Carling Cup at bbc.co.uk
 Results service at soccerbase.com

EFL Cup seasons
Cup